

References

Taiwan
Massacres

Massacres